The Jewish Post & News of Winnipeg, Manitoba, Canada, is Western Canada's first and oldest Anglo-Jewish newspaper, so described because its language was English rather than Yiddish though its concerns were those of the Canadian Jewish community particularly in Western Canada.

The Jewish Post
Originally known as The Jewish Post, it was founded in 1925 by Ben Cohen. After going through a succession of owners it was purchased in 1984 by its then-editor, Matt Bellan, along with his brother Bernie, and the paper's then-advertising manager, Gail Frankel.
In 1987, The Jewish Post  purchased the rival Western Jewish News and the title after the merger of the two publications was changed to The Jewish Post & News. In August 2007, the newspaper changed its publication schedule from weekly to bi-weekly. In 2008, Matt Bellan retired as editor of the paper. Bernie Bellan has been both editor and publisher of the paper ever since.

Western Jewish News 
The Jewish Post was in direct heated competition with the Winnipeg-based Western Jewish News established by Sam Berg in 1926, just a few weeks after establishment of The Post. The Jewish Post was also in rivalry with Der Yiddishe Vorte (also known as The Israelite Press), a Yiddish-language daily that started in 1911 that after many years was published as a weekly. All three, the Post, the News and Der Yiddishe Vorte served the Jewish communities from Northern Ontario all the way to British Columbia with both news and advertising. Rivalry continued as The Israelite Press reverted to a weekly half-English, half-Yiddish weekly in the early post-Second World War years, finally ceasing publication in 1976.

The Jewish Post and News
The Western Jewish News engaged in a fierce fight for advertising with the Jewish Post for six decades until it was purchased by The Jewish Post in 1987, resulting in the paper's merger and current name of The Jewish Post & News which continues publishing to this day.

External links
Jewish Post & News website

Jewish newspapers published in Canada
Jews and Judaism in Winnipeg
Newspapers published in Winnipeg
Weekly newspapers published in Manitoba
Publications established in 1925
1925 establishments in Manitoba